The Training and Doctrine Command (TRADOC Minna) is a research-oriented formation in the Nigerian Army. It is headquartered in Minna in the Niger State. TRADOC is charged with doctrinal training and combat development, supervising training centers. It also serves as a senior think-tank in Nigeria. TRADOC was formed in 1981 under the leadership of Major General Geoffrey Obiaje Ejiga, and currently supervises all the Army's schools, as well as an army depot. Before the establishment of the Nigerian Army Resources Centre (NARC) in 2015, TRADOC also; served as a liaison centre for the Army.

Functions 
TRADOC supports army training and coordinates research on the development of army corps and schools.  It serves as a liaison between the army and educational establishments in ensuring the professional development of junior officers in the field. When multiple army divisions concurrently deploy, TRADOC serves as a corps headquarters to direct the operational tasks of the divisions.

Structure
Outside its organizational departments, TRADOC consists of 18 corps training schools, as well as a museum, a training depot and a command college. TRADOC also sponsors the Nigerian Military School at Zaria. The Training and Doctrine Command consists of:  

 Departments
 Department of Doctrine and Combat Development
 Department of Training
 Department of Research Development, Test and Evaluation
 Directorate of Army Training Support Center

 Schools 
 Army School of Infantry (NASI)
 Army Armor School (NAAS)
 Army School of Artillery (NASA)
 Army School of Engineering (NASME)
 Army School of Signals (NASS)
 Army Intelligence School (NAIS)
 Army School of Supply and Transport (NASST)
 Army Ordnance School (NAOS)
 Army School of Medical Science (NASMS)
 Army School of Electrical and Mechanical Engineering (NASEME)
 Army School of Military Police (NASMP)
 Army School of Education (NASE)
 Army School of Finance and Account (NASFA)
 Army School of Music (NASM)
 Army School of Physical Training (ASPT)
 Amphibious Training School (ATS)
 Army School of Islamic Affairs (NASIA)
 Army School of Public Relations and Information (NASPRI)
 Nigerian Army Museum (NAM)
 Depot Nigerian Army
 Nigerian Army College of Logistics (NACOL)

Commanders 

 Major General Salihu Zaway Uba (2012 – September 2013)

 General Abayomi Olonisakin (September 2013 – July 2015)

 Major General Lucky Irabor (July 2020 – January 2021)

See also 
 Armed Forces Training Authority (Egypt)
 Military Educational and Scientific Center
 Indonesian Army Doctrine, Education and Training Development Command
 Malaysian Army Training and Doctrine Command

References 

Military units and formations of Nigeria
Nigerian Army
Military education and training in Nigeria